Alleyrat may refer to:

 Alleyrat, Corrèze, a commune of the Corrèze département in France
 Alleyrat, Creuse, a commune of the Creuse département in France